Porto Amazonas is a municipality in the state of Paraná in the Southern Region of Brazil.

See also
List of municipalities in Paraná

References

External links
Porto Amazonas boundaries on Google Maps

Municipalities in Paraná